Moseley Old Hall is a small 17th century country house in Cheadle, Greater Manchester, England. The construction date of the hall is uncertain though there is an inscription carved into the doorway, reading, 'R.M. 1663'; it is a Grade II* listed building. It would originally have been surrounded by fields and farmland, but is now at the end of a suburban road.

See also

Grade II* listed buildings in Greater Manchester
Listed buildings in Cheadle and Gatley

References

Houses in Greater Manchester
Grade II* listed buildings in Greater Manchester
Buildings and structures in the Metropolitan Borough of Stockport
Cheadle, Greater Manchester